Michael Rutschky (25 May 1943 in Berlin – 18 March 2018 in Berlin) was a German author.

Life
Michael Rutschky grew up in Spangenberg, Hesse.  From 1963 to 1971, he studied Sociology, Literary Science and Philosophy at the Universities Frankfurt am Main (amongst others under Theodor W. Adorno and Jürgen Habermas), Göttingen and FU Berlin.  From 1969 to 1978, he worked as a social researcher at the Freie Universität Berlin; he would attain a Doctorate there as a Doctor of Philosophy.  From 1979 to 1984, he lived in Munich.  There he belonged to the Editing of the periodical Merkur and the editor of the TransAtlantik in 1980/81.  Since 1985, he again works and lives in Berlin.  From 1985 to 1997, he was contributing editor to the periodical Der Alltag.

Michael Rutschky wrote essays in whose Narrative passages and sociological interpretation of the everyday present enter into an original mixture and a comical work not seldom produced.

Michael Rutschky was a member of the PEN Zentrums Deutschland.  He received the 1997 Heinrich Mann Prize; in 1999 he held the poetic dozent of the University of Heidelberg.  He is Scholar at the Internationales Künstlerhaus Villa Concordia in Bamberg.

He was married to the educationalist and publisher Katharina Rutschky until her death in January 2010.

Works
Schüler im Literaturunterricht (Students in the Literary Teaching), Cologne 1975 (together with Hartmut Eggert and Hans Christoph Berg)
Studien zur psychoanalytischen Interpretation von Literatur (Studies of the Psychoanalytical Interpretation of Literature), Berlin 1978
Erfahrungshunger (Experience Hunger), Cologne 1980
Lektüre der Seele (Lectures of the Soul), Frankfurt am Main [et al.] 1981
Wartezeit (Waiting Time), Cologne 1983
Zur Ethnographie des Inlands (Of the Demographics of the Home Country), Frankfurt am Main 1984
Auf Reisen (From Trips), Frankfurt am Main 1986
Was man zum Leben wissen muß (What one must know to live), Zürich 1987
Thomas – mach ein Bild von uns! (Thomas - make a Picture of us!), München [et al.] 1988 (together with Thomas Karsten and Peter Brasch)
Reise durch das Ungeschick und andere Meisterstücke (Trips through the Awkward and other Mater Pieces), Zürich 1990
Mit Dr. Siebert in Amerika (With Dr. Siebert in America), Zürich [et al.] 1991
Traumnachrichten (Dream News), Hersbruck 1991
Unterwegs im Beitrittsgebiet (Away in the Member Area), Göttingen 1994
Die Meinungsfreude (The Opinion's Friends), Göttingen 1997
Der verborgene Brecht (The Hidden Break), Zürich [et al.] 1997 (together with Juergen Teller)
Lebensromane (Life Novels), Göttingen 1998
Berlin, Berlin 2001
Wie wir Amerikaner wurden (How we became American), München 2004

PublisherErrungenschaften (Achievements), Frankfurt am Main 1982Ein Jahresbericht (The Yearly Report), Frankfurt am Main 1983Tag für Tag (Day for Day), Frankfurt am Main 1984Die andere Chronik'' (The Other Chronicle) 1987, Cologne 1987

References

External links
Literature by and on Michael Rutschky in the Catalog of the German National Library
Short Biography from the Pages of taz
Biography with a Photo

1943 births
2018 deaths
Writers from Berlin
Heinrich Mann Prize winners
German male writers